The Clausen German war cemetery ( in German) is a German military cemetery in Luxembourg City. The cemetery primarily contains remains from World War I and World War II; however it also contains military remains from the Belgian Revolution, the Prussian garrison located in the city between 1815–1867 and the Franco-Prussian War.

Description

1815–1867 Prussian garrison burials
As a consequence of the Congress of Vienna became part of German Confederation and Luxembourg City was placed under mixed military control. The military garrison in Luxembourg City was limited to 6,000 troops; with three-quarters being Prussian and one-quarter Dutch. A German military contingent remained in Luxembourg City until 1867 when the Treaty of London mandated the demolition of the westward fortifications of Luxembourg City and the withdrawal of the Prussian garrison which had been sited in Luxembourg since 1815 in accordance with the decisions of the Congress of Vienna.

World War I and World War II burials
During the winter and spring 1945 battles in Luxembourg, the American grave service recovered the remains of German casualties of the Battle of Bulge and buried them in two provisional burial grounds; the Germans in Sandweiler, the Americans in Hamm. Following an agreement reached in 1952 between the Grand Duchy of Luxembourg and the Federal Republic of Germany, German remains from 150 different cemeteries throughout Luxembourg were moved to Sandweiler German war cemetery; however, those in Clausen were left in place.

References

Sources

External links
 

1813 establishments in Luxembourg
Cemeteries in Luxembourg
German War Graves Commission
Parks in Luxembourg City
Luxembourg in World War II
Luxembourg in World War I
Monuments and memorials in Luxembourg